Don Paul Taxay (born c. 1934 in Chicago) was an American numismatist and historian, known for the reference works he composed, and for his disappearance at the height of his career.

Career in numismatics
Taxay's first published work was Counterfeit, Mis-Struck and unofficial U.S. Coins, in 1963, followed by The U.S. Mint and Coinage in 1966 (which Gilroy Roberts called "the most complete and authoritative treatise on the subject ever written"), An Illustrated History of U.S. Commemorative Coinage in 1967, Money of the American Indians in 1970, and Scott's Comprehensive Catalogue and Encyclopedia of United States Coins in 1971. He also served as the curator of the Chase Manhattan Bank Money Museum from April 1964 to May 1966. In 1974, he joined award-winning numismatist Harry Forman in establishing the coin dealership of Forman, Taxay and Associates. In approximately 1977, Taxay withdrew from society.

Disappearance
In 2005-2006, the members of the Numismatic Bibliomania Society's mailing list undertook a joint research project to discover what had happened to Taxay. They established that Taxay had been introduced to Indian spirituality by Walter Breen, and that as a result, Taxay became a Rajneeshee and emigrated to India. Historian Karl Moultonwhose 2007 book Henry Voigt and Others Involved in America's Early Coinage includes a chapter analyzing Taxay's historiographyspeculates that Taxay attempted to liquidate all his property so that he could donate his wealth to the Bhagwan Shree Rajneesh, and describes him as "brainwashed and untraceable", concluding that Taxay's ultimate fate may never be known.

See also
 List of people who disappeared

References

External links
Correspondence between Taxay and Eric P. Newman, at archive.org

1970s missing person cases
20th-century American historians
American male non-fiction writers
American Conservatory of Music alumni
American numismatists
Historians from Illinois
1930s births
Missing person cases in India
People from Chicago
Rajneesh movement
20th-century American male writers
Living people